The North Umpqua River is a tributary of the Umpqua River, about  long, in southwestern Oregon in the United States. It drains a scenic and rugged area of the Cascade Range southeast of Eugene, flowing through steep canyons and surrounded by large Douglas-fir forests. Renowned for its emerald green waters, it is considered one of the best fly fishing streams in the Pacific Northwest for anadromous fish.

Description
It follows a serpentine course down from the Cascades, westward along the southern side of the Calapooya Mountains. Its upper course passes through the Umpqua National Forest, past Toketee Falls and Steamboat, where it receives Steamboat Creek from the north.

It is impounded in its upper reaches in the Cascades to form Lemolo Lake for hydroelectricity. It is also impounded for hydroelectricity at Soda Springs Dam, forming a small reservoir on the upper river.

The river's reputation as a world-class steelhead stream and its famous emerald waters are a result of the fact the river source is high enough in the Cascades to derive from snowmelt during the entire year. The melting snow is trapped in volcanic soil and pumice and released during the summer months, providing an even cool-temperature flow. During the summer the flow of the river is approximately 20 times that of the nearby South Umpqua. In its lower reaches, the river's flow becomes increasingly erratic, in a manner typical of mountain streams of the region.

The region around the river has long been a timber-producing area. Starting in 1955, the watershed of the river was extensively clear cut, a practice which continued until 1969 when forestry management practices were changed. During this period many tributary streambeds were used as impromptu logging roads. The recovery of the river from these practices has been closely monitored by state and federal agencies.

Recreation

In 1988, the United States Congress designated  of the river between the Soda Springs Powerhouse and Rock Creek as wild and scenic under the National Wild and Scenic River program. Angling on this part of the river, frequented by salmon and steelhead, is limited to fly fishing.

On the North Umpqua, rafters and kayakers find whitewater challenges from Class I (easy) through IV (advanced) on the International Scale of River Difficulty from May through the summer months. The North Umpqua Trail, which runs parallel to the river, supports hiking and biking.

Tributaries
Named tributaries of the North Umpqua River from source to mouth are Tolo and Bradley creeks and Spring River, then Lake, Poole, White Mule, Warm Spring, Nancy, Beverly, Helen, Norma, Dorothy, and Sally creeks. Then Potter, Nurse, Barkenburger, Patricia, Alvin, Charlia, Loafer, and Deer creeks, followed by the Clearwater River and Fish, Medicine, Boulder, Eagle, and Copeland creeks.

Below that come Dark Canyon, Wilson and Deception creeks, Dry Gulch, and Dry, Happy, Calf, Dog, Limpy, Apple, Jack, Redman, Steamboat, Alder, Fisher, Williams, and Timber creeks. Further downstream are Archie, Cougar, Bogus, John, Wright, Raspberry, Fairview, Fall, and Thunder creeks. Then Burnt, Swamp, Fox, Cole, Susan, Hogback, Bob, Honey, Clay, Hill, Rock, Britt, Old Hatchery, and French creeks. Little River is next, followed by Fordice, Huntley, Cooper, Oak, Clover, Dixon, and Sutherlin creeks.

See also
 List of rivers of Oregon
 List of longest streams of Oregon
 List of National Wild and Scenic Rivers

References

External links

 North Umpqua Hydroelectric Project
 North Umpqua Geology  Documentary produced by Oregon Public Broadcasting
 North Umpqua Wild and Scenic River - BLM page

Rivers of Oregon
Wild and Scenic Rivers of the United States
Rivers of Douglas County, Oregon
Umpqua National Forest